Sangchris Lake State Recreation Area is an Illinois state park on  in Christian and Sangamon Counties, Illinois, United States. The Sangchris Lake makes up a large portion of this state park.

References

State parks of Illinois
Protected areas of Sangamon County, Illinois
Protected areas established in 1964
Protected areas of Christian County, Illinois
1964 establishments in Illinois